Arkansas Highway 185 (AR 185, Ark. 185, and Hwy. 185) is the designation for a state highway in the U.S. state of Arkansas. The route is split into three sections, which are all located in eastern Arkansas. The first section begins at AR 242 and ends at US Highway 49 Business (US 49B) in Helena-West Helena. The second section begins at US 49 near Wycamp, or just west of Helena-West Helena, and ends at AR 242 just north of Helena-West Helena. The third section begins at County Road 215 (CR 215) in Lee County and ends at AR 44 near Marianna.

Route description

Helena-West Helena route 
The southern terminus for AR 185 is at AR 242 in West Helena, just east of US 49. The route itself does not intersect any other signed highways.

Airport Road 
The southern terminus for AR 185 is at US 49 in Wycamp, or just west of West Helena. The route heads almost directly east for about  until it reaches its northern terminus at AR 242 just north of Helena-West Helena.

Lee County route 
The southern terminus for AR 185 in Lee County is at CR 215 in the St. Francis National Forest. The route heads almost directly north for about  before reaching its northern terminus at AR 44 just east of Marianna. The route is very rural and does not intersect any other highways or communities.

Major intersections

References

External links 

185
Transportation in Phillips County, Arkansas
Transportation in Lee County, Arkansas